Tilt was an alcoholic beverage launched by Anheuser-Busch in the United States in August 2005. Its alcoholic content by volume varied and was higher than most American beer (commonly 3–6%), 10% in the lemon lime flavor, to 12% in the new Tilt Red variety, which is a blend of fruit flavors such as cherry, orange, grape, lime and tropical fruit. Tilt drink products were sold in 16 and 24 fluid ounce cans. 

Tilt has been discontinued.

History
Tilt was introduced as an energy drink containing alcohol, and marketed as a "Premium Malt Beverage". The original formulation's active ingredients included caffeine, ginseng and Guarana. In 2008, a re formulated Tilt was launched with only caffeine. Budweiser changed the formulation for similar reasons to Miller Brewing Company, manufacturer of Sparks. 

Under pressure from special interest groups which in turn put pressure on state governments, caffeine was later banned as well. In September 2010, Tilt was reintroduced in a twenty four fluid ounce can similar to Four Loko.

Related products
Other "malternatives" that used similar energy formulations include 3SUM, Four Loko, Joose, and Sparks. Tilt's alcoholic content by volume is similar to various formulations of these other drinks. The formulations for all US malt beverages containing caffeine changed between 2010 and 2011 due to pressure from Washington, DC lobbyists and the Food and Drug Administration. 

The U.S. Centers for Disease Control and Prevention had also delivered findings that these drinks were particularly in vogue with minors, and were likely to cause blackouts and other health risks, and increased the likelihood of a rape occurring, both on the part of the rapist and the victim. These findings, combined with parental outcry led to a ban on caffeinated alcoholic beverages in the United States.

References

Alcopops
Food and drink introduced in 2005
Energy drinks
American alcoholic drinks